Grot (Serbian Cyrillic: Грот) is a mountain in southern Serbia, near the city of Vranje. Its highest peak has an elevation of 1,327 meters above sea level.

Like the nearby Oblik, Grot is an ancient inactive volcano.

References

Mountains of Serbia